Adelolecia kolaensis is a species of crustose lichen belonging to the family Lecanoraceae.

It is native to Europe and Northern America.

References

Lichens described in 1863
Lichen species
Fungi of Europe
Fungi of North America
Taxa named by William Nylander (botanist)